The Cleaning Lady may refer to:

 Cleaning lady, a woman who works as a cleaner
 The Cleaning Lady (Argentine TV series), a 2017 drama series
 The Cleaning Lady (Mexican TV series), a 2021 adaptation of the Argentine series
 The Cleaning Lady (American TV series), a 2022 adaptation of the Argentine series
 "Sadie (The Cleaning Lady)", a 1967 song by Johnny Farnham

See also
 Cleaner (disambiguation)
 Custodian (disambiguation)
 Janitor (disambiguation)